In applied statistics, total least squares is a type of errors-in-variables regression, a least squares data modeling technique in which observational errors on both dependent and independent variables are taken into account. It is a generalization of Deming regression and also of orthogonal regression, and can be applied to both linear and non-linear models.

The total least squares approximation of the data is generically equivalent to the best, in the Frobenius norm, low-rank approximation of the data matrix.

Linear model

Background

In the least squares method of data modeling, the objective function, S,

is minimized, where r is the vector of residuals and W is a weighting matrix. In linear least squares the model contains equations which are linear in the parameters appearing in the parameter vector , so the residuals are given by

There are m observations in y and n parameters in β with m>n. X is a m×n matrix whose elements are either constants or functions of the independent variables, x. The weight matrix W is, ideally, the inverse of the variance-covariance matrix  of the observations y. The independent variables are assumed to be error-free. The parameter estimates are found by setting the gradient equations to zero, which results in the normal equations

Allowing observation errors in all variables

Now, suppose that both x and y are observed subject to error, with variance-covariance matrices  and  respectively. In this case the objective function can be written as

Clearly these residuals cannot be independent of each other, but they must be constrained by some kind of relationship.

Thus, the problem is to minimize the objective function subject to the m constraints. It is solved by the use of Lagrange multipliers. After some algebraic manipulations, the result is obtained.

or alternatively 
where M is the variance-covariance matrix relative to both independent and dependent variables.

Example 

When the data errors are uncorrelated, all matrices M and W are diagonal. Then, take the example of straight line fitting.

in this case

showing how the variance at the ith point is determined by the variances of both independent and dependent variables and by the model being used to fit the data. The expression may be generalized by noting that the parameter  is the slope of the line.

An expression of this type is used in fitting pH titration data where a small error on x translates to a large error on y when the slope is large.

Algebraic point of view 
As was shown in 1980 by Golub and Van Loan, the TLS problem does not have a solution in general. The following considers the simple case where a unique solution exists without making any particular assumptions.

The computation of the TLS using singular value decomposition (SVD) is described in standard texts. We can solve the equation 

for B where X is m-by-n and Y is m-by-k. 

That is, we seek to find B that minimizes error matrices E and F for X and Y respectively. That is,

This can be rewritten as

where  is the  identity matrix.
Define  to be the singular value decomposition of the augmented matrix .

where V is partitioned into blocks corresponding to the shape of X and Y.

That is, we want

so by linearity,

We can then remove blocks from the U and Σ matrices, simplifying to

This provides E and F so that 

 
and so

A naive GNU Octave implementation of this is:

function B = tls(X, Y)

[m n]   = size(X);             % n is the width of X (X is m by n)
Z       = [X Y];               % Z is X augmented with Y.
[U S V] = svd(Z, 0);           % find the SVD of Z.
VXY     = V(1:n, 1+n:end);     % Take the block of V consisting of the first n rows and the n+1 to last column
VYY     = V(1+n:end, 1+n:end); % Take the bottom-right block of V.
B       = -VXY / VYY;

end

The way described above of solving the problem, which requires that the matrix  is nonsingular, can be slightly extended by the so-called classical TLS algorithm.

Computation 

The standard implementation of classical TLS algorithm is available through Netlib, see also. All modern implementations based, for example, on solving a sequence of ordinary least squares problems, approximate the matrix  (denoted  in the literature), as introduced by Van Huffel and Vandewalle. It is worth noting, that this  is, however, not the TLS solution in many cases.

Non-linear model 
For non-linear systems similar reasoning shows that the normal equations for an iteration cycle can be written as

where  is the Jacobian matrix.

Geometrical interpretation 

When the independent variable is error-free a residual represents the "vertical" distance between the observed data point and the fitted curve (or surface). In total least squares a residual represents the distance between a data point and the fitted curve measured along some direction. In fact, if both variables are measured in the same units and the errors on both variables are the same, then the residual represents the shortest distance between the data point and the fitted curve, that is, the residual vector is perpendicular to the tangent of the curve. For this reason, this type of regression is sometimes called two dimensional Euclidean regression (Stein, 1983) or orthogonal regression.

Scale invariant methods 
A serious difficulty arises if the variables are not measured in the same units. First consider measuring distance between a data point and the line: what are the measurement units for this distance? If we consider measuring distance based on Pythagoras' Theorem then it is clear that we shall be adding quantities measured in different units, which is  meaningless. Secondly, if we rescale one of the variables e.g., measure in grams rather than kilograms, then we shall end up with different results (a different line). To avoid these problems it is sometimes suggested that we convert to dimensionless variables—this may be called normalization or standardization. However, there are various ways of doing this, and these lead to fitted models which are not equivalent to each other. One approach is to normalize by known (or estimated) measurement precision thereby minimizing the Mahalanobis distance from the points to the line, providing a maximum-likelihood solution; the unknown precisions could be found via analysis of variance.

In short, total least squares does not have the property of units-invariance—i.e. it is not scale invariant. For a meaningful model we require this property to hold. A way forward is to realise that residuals (distances) measured in different units can be combined if multiplication is used instead of addition. Consider fitting a line: for each data point the product of the vertical and horizontal residuals equals twice the area of the triangle formed by the residual lines and the fitted line. We choose the line which minimizes the sum of these areas. Nobel laureate Paul Samuelson proved in 1942 that, in two dimensions, it is the only line expressible solely in terms of the ratios of standard deviations and the correlation coefficient which (1) fits the correct equation when the observations fall on a straight line, (2) exhibits scale invariance, and (3) exhibits invariance under interchange of variables. This solution has been rediscovered in different disciplines and is variously known as standardised major axis (Ricker 1975, Warton et al., 2006), the reduced major axis, the geometric mean functional relationship (Draper and Smith, 1998), least products regression, diagonal regression, line of organic correlation, and the least areas line (Tofallis, 2002). Tofallis (2015) has extended this approach to deal with multiple variables.

See also 
 Deming regression, a special case with two predictors and independent errors.
 Errors-in-variables model
 Gauss-Helmert model
 Linear regression
 Least squares
 Principal component analysis
 Principal component regression

Notes

References

Others
 I. Hnětynková, M. Plešinger, D. M. Sima, Z. Strakoš, and S. Van Huffel, The total least squares problem in AX ≈ B. A new classification with the relationship to the classical works. SIMAX vol. 32 issue 3 (2011), pp. 748–770. Available  as a preprint.
 M. Plešinger, The Total Least Squares Problem and Reduction of Data in AX ≈ B. Doctoral Thesis, TU of Liberec and Institute of Computer Science, AS CR Prague, 2008. Ph.D. Thesis
 C. C. Paige, Z. Strakoš, Core problems in linear algebraic systems. SIAM J. Matrix Anal. Appl. 27, 2006, pp. 861–875. 
 S. Van Huffel and P. Lemmerling, Total Least Squares and Errors-in-Variables Modeling: Analysis,   Algorithms and Applications. Dordrecht, The Netherlands: Kluwer Academic Publishers, 2002.
 S. Jo and S. W. Kim, Consistent normalized least mean square filtering with noisy data matrix. IEEE Trans. Signal Process., vol. 53, no. 6, pp. 2112–2123, Jun. 2005.
 R. D. DeGroat and E. M. Dowling, The data least squares problem and channel equalization. IEEE Trans. Signal Process., vol. 41, no. 1, pp. 407–411, Jan. 1993.
 S. Van Huffel and J. Vandewalle, The Total Least Squares Problems: Computational Aspects and Analysis. SIAM Publications, Philadelphia PA, 1991. 
 T. Abatzoglou and J. Mendel, Constrained total least squares, in Proc. IEEE Int. Conf. Acoust., Speech, Signal Process. (ICASSP’87), Apr. 1987, vol. 12, pp. 1485–1488.
 P. de Groen An introduction to total least squares, in Nieuw Archief voor Wiskunde, Vierde serie, deel 14, 1996, pp. 237–253 arxiv.org.
 G. H. Golub and C. F. Van Loan, An analysis of the total least squares problem. SIAM J. on Numer. Anal., 17, 1980, pp. 883–893. 
 Perpendicular Regression Of A Line at MathPages
 A. R. Amiri-Simkooei and S. Jazaeri Weighted total least squares formulated by standard least squares theory,in Journal of Geodetic Science, 2 (2): 113–124, 2012 .

Applied mathematics
Curve fitting
Least squares
Regression models